Murrayville is a town on the section of the Mallee Highway and Pinnaroo railway line between Ouyen and the South Australian border. At the 2016 census, Murrayville had a population of 280, down from 444 ten years before.

The local school, Murrayville Community College is a P-12 school.

History
The Post Office opened on 1 November 1910. The Murrayville railway station opened in 1912 but is no longer used for passengers.

The area of the locality contains a number of smaller areas namely Duddo which had a post office open from 1913 until 1918, Duddo Wells with a post office from 1914 until 1950, Danyo with a post office from 1912 (when the railway arrived) until 1975, and Goongee.

Murrayville Magistrates' Court closed on 1 January 1983.

Industry
The town's main industry is cereal crops, sheep and cattle, other industries are potato farming and other small crops. Irrigation is only supplied to the potato farms by an underground basin of high quality water.

Sport and culture
The town's dramatic society has been running for 46 years straight.

Golfers play at the Murrayville Golf Club.

During Easter 2010, Murrayville celebrated its centenary.  Visitors from all over Australia attended with 1300 dinner meals delivered on the Saturday night and 900 for the Sunday evening meal.  Included in the attractions were a collection of antique farm machinery, a display of old cars, an animal nursery, a bucking bull and a dual carriage small motorised train.

Residents
Murrayville is the birthplace of former Formula One driver and six time Bathurst 1000 winner Larry Perkins. Olympic basketballer Rachael Sporn was also born in Murrayville.

References

External links

 
Towns in Victoria (Australia)
Mallee (Victoria)